This list is of the Places of Scenic Beauty of Japan located within the Prefecture of Aichi.

National Places of Scenic Beauty
As of 1 July 2020, seven Places have been designated at a national level; the Kiso River spans the prefectural borders with Gifu.

Prefectural Places of Scenic Beauty
As of 1 May 2019, five Places have been designated at a prefectural level.

Municipal Places of Scenic Beauty
As of 1 May 2019, eighteen Places have been designated at a municipal level.

Registered Places of Scenic Beauty
As of 1 July 2020, two Monuments have been registered (as opposed to designated) as Places of Scenic Beauty at a national level.

See also
 Cultural Properties of Japan
 List of parks in Aichi Prefecture
 List of Historic Sites of Japan (Aichi)

References

External links
  Cultural Properties of Aichi Prefecture
  Places of Scenic Beauty of Aichi Prefecture

Tourist attractions in Aichi Prefecture
Places of Scenic Beauty